Marion Scott may refer to:

 Marion Scott (musicologist) (1877–1953), English violinist, musicologist and writer
 Marion Scott (model), German-born American model
 Marion duPont Scott (1894–1983), American philanthropist and thoroughbred horsebreeder
 Marion McCarrell Scott (1843–1922), American educator and government advisor in Meiji period Japan